Universal Signs is a modern American Sign Language (ASL) film from 2008.

Plot 
After the death of his fiancée’s daughter while in his care, Andrew (Anthony Natale), a Deaf artist, becomes a prisoner of his own mind. Tormented day and night by memories and self-blame, Andrew falls in a downward spiral of depression and anger that alienates everyone around him. It is only through a serendipitous friendship and new love with Mary (Sabrina Lloyd) that Andrew is able to sense the life around him – forgive himself, rediscover his muse, and experience the transformative power of love.

Cast 
 Anthony Natale, Andrew
Sabrina Lloyd, Mary
Lupe Ontiveros, Claire
Margot Kidder, Rose Callahan
Robert Picardo, Father Joe
Aimee Garcia, Trish
Robert Hogan, Mr. Callahan
Troy Kotsur, Chris
Deanne Bray, Natalie
Ashlyn Sanchez, Katie
Robert DeMayo, The Peddler

See also

List of films featuring the deaf and hard of hearing

External links 
US on ČSFD.cz

American silent feature films
American drama films
2008 films
American Sign Language films
2008 drama films
2000s American films
Silent American drama films